Burton Point railway station was located on the northern side of Station Road, at Burton, Cheshire, England. The station opened on 1 August 1899 on the North Wales and Liverpool Railway. The station closed to passengers, and completely, on 5 December 1955. Although the platform waiting rooms and footbridge were demolished after closure, the yellow and redbrick main building remains in use as part of a garden centre and the platforms are still in existence. The line through the former station remains in use as part of the Borderlands Line.

References

Sources

Disused railway stations in Cheshire
Railway stations in Great Britain opened in 1899
Railway stations in Great Britain closed in 1955
Former Great Central Railway stations
1899 establishments in England
Burton (near Neston)